The list of Interstate Highways in Arkansas encompasses nine members of the Dwight D. Eisenhower National System of Interstate and Defense Highways in the state of Arkansas.

Cable median barriers
The 2010–2013 Statewide Transportation Improvement Program from the Arkansas State Highway and Transportation Department (AHTD) lists cable median barrier installation projects along segments of Interstate 30, Interstate 40, Interstate 55, Interstate 430, and Interstate 540 (also US 67 {Future Interstate 57} from Cabot to Jacksonville) to begin as funds become available.

Primary Interstates

Auxiliary Interstates

References

 
Interstate